Pseudopostega latiapicula is a moth of the family Opostegidae. It was described by Donald R. Davis and Jonas R. Stonis, 2007. It is known from the La Selva Biological Station of north-eastern Costa Rica and the state of Paraná in north-eastern Brazil.

The length of the forewings is about 2.4 mm. Adults have been recorded in January, February and August.

Etymology
The species name is derived from the Latin latus (meaning broad, wide) and apiculus (meaning little top, apex), in reference to the broad apex of the caudal lobe of the male gnathos.

References

Opostegidae
Moths described in 2007